NVI F.K.31 was a Dutch designed parasol wing two seat reconnaissance-fighter, which was developed in the 1920s by Frederick Koolhoven.  The aircraft saw some service in the Finnish Air Force.

History

The F.K.31 became Koolhoven's first design for the N.V. Nationale Vliegtuig Industrie ("National Aircraft Industry") a two-seat scout and fighter. Its prototype became the sensation of the Paris Air Salon of 1922. However, the production of the F.K.31 met with many difficulties, forcing the N.V. Nationale Vliegtuig Industrie to close down.

Further development was carried out in France, resulting in the De Monge M.101 C2, but only a single example was built, powered by a Gnome & Rhône 9Ac radial engine.

Use in Finland
The Finnish Air Force used twelve F.K.31s between 1926-1932. The aircraft had been purchased while the development still was being carried out. The Finnish pilots disliked the aircraft and the Finnish Air Force F.K.31s flew for fewer than 6 hours each.

The Koolhoven F.K.31 was called Kolho ("Clumsy") or Kolhovene ("Clumsy Boat") in the Finnish Air Force.

Operators
  
 Finnish Air Force
 
 LA-KNIL

Specifications

References

 

F.K.31
1920s Dutch military reconnaissance aircraft
Parasol-wing aircraft
Single-engined tractor aircraft
Aircraft first flown in 1923
Aircraft of the Royal Netherlands East Indies Army